The Fourth Rutte cabinet is the current  Government of the Netherlands. It was inaugurated on 10 January 2022. The cabinet is a continuation of the previous third Rutte cabinet and is formed by the conservative-liberal People's Party for Freedom and Democracy (VVD), the social-liberal Democrats 66 and the christian-democratic Christian Democratic Appeal (CDA) and Christian Union (CU) after the election of 2021.

Cabinet members

References

Cabinets of the Netherlands
2022 establishments in the Netherlands
Cabinets established in 2022
Current governments